Suction is the air pressure differential between areas. 

Removing air from a space results in a pressure differential. Suction pressure is therefore limited by external air pressure. Even a perfect vacuum cannot suck with more pressure than is available in the surrounding environment. Suctions can form on the sea, for example, when a ship founders.

When the pressure in one part of a physical system is reduced relative to another, the fluid in the higher pressure region will exert a force relative to the region of lowered pressure, referred to as pressure-gradient force. Pressure reduction may be static, as in a piston and cylinder arrangement, or dynamic, as in the case of a vacuum cleaner when air flow results in a reduced pressure region.

When animals breathe, the diaphragm and muscles around the rib cage cause a change of volume in the lungs. The increased volume of the chest cavity decreases the pressure inside, creating an imbalance with the ambient air pressure, resulting in suction.

See also 

Pump
Vacuum pump
Suction devices used in medicine
Implosion
 Suction cup
 Suction cupping

References 

Physical quantities
Units of pressure
Vacuum